Weaverville Airport , also known as Lonnie Pool Field, is a public airport located one mile (1.6 km) northeast of Weaverville, serving Trinity County, California, United States.

References

External links 

Airports in Trinity County, California